Alexios I Komnenos (1057 – 15 August 1118; Latinized Alexius I Comnenus) was Byzantine emperor from 1081 to 1118. Although he was not the first emperor of the Komnenian dynasty, it was during his reign that the Komnenos family came to full power and initiated a hereditary succession to the throne. Inheriting a collapsing empire and faced with constant warfare during his reign against both the Seljuq Turks in Asia Minor and the Normans in the western Balkans, Alexios was able to curb the Byzantine decline and begin the military, financial, and territorial recovery known as the Komnenian restoration. His appeals to Western Europe for help against the Turks was the catalyst that sparked the First Crusade.

Biography 
Alexios was the son of John Komnenos and Anna Dalassene, and the nephew of Isaac I Komnenos (emperor 1057–1059). Alexios' father declined the throne on the abdication of Isaac, who was thus succeeded by Constantine X Doukas (r. 1059–1067) and died as a monk in 1067.  Alexios and his elder brother, Manuel Komnenos served under Romanos IV Diogenes (r. 1068–1071) with distinction against the Seljuk Turks. Under Michael VII Doukas Parapinakes (1071–1078) and Nikephoros III Botaneiates (1078–1081), he was militarily employed, along with his elder brother Isaac, against rebels in Asia Minor, Thrace, and in Epirus.

In 1074, western mercenaries led by Roussel de Bailleul rebelled in Asia Minor, but Alexios successfully subdued them by 1076. In 1078, he was appointed commander of the field army in the West by Nikephoros III. In this capacity, Alexios defeated the rebellions of Nikephoros Bryennios the Elder (whose son or grandson later married Alexios' daughter Anna) and Nikephoros Basilakes, the first at the Battle of Kalavrye and the latter in a surprise night attack on his camp. Alexios was ordered to march against his brother-in-law Nikephoros Melissenos in Asia Minor but refused to fight his kinsman. This did not, however, lead to a demotion, as Alexios was needed to counter the expected invasion of the Normans of Southern Italy, led by Robert Guiscard.

Conspiracy and revolt of the Komnenoi against Botaneiates
While Byzantine troops were assembling for the expedition, the Doukas faction at court approached Alexios and convinced him to join a conspiracy against Nikephoros III. The mother of Alexios, Anna Dalassene, was to play a prominent role in this coup d'état of 1081, along with the current empress, Maria of Alania. First married to Michael VII Doukas and secondly to Nikephoros III Botaneiates, she was preoccupied with the future of her son by Michael VII, Constantine Doukas. Nikephoros III intended to leave the throne to one of his close relatives, and this resulted in Maria's ambivalence and alliance with the Komnenoi, though the real driving force behind this political alliance was Anna Dalassene.

The empress was already closely connected to the Komnenoi through Maria's cousin Irene's marriage to Isaac Komnenos, so the Komnenoi brothers were able to see her under the pretense of a friendly family visit. Furthermore, to aid the conspiracy Maria had adopted Alexios as her son, though she was only five years older than he. Maria was persuaded to do so on the advice of her own "Alans" and her eunuchs, who had been instigated by Isaac Komnenos. Given Anna's tight hold on her family, Alexios must have been adopted with her implicit approval. As a result, Alexios and Constantine, Maria's son, were now adoptive brothers, and both Isaac and Alexios took an oath that they would safeguard his rights as emperor. By secretly giving inside information to the Komnenoi, Maria was an invaluable ally.

As stated in the Alexiad, Isaac and Alexios left Constantinople in mid-February 1081 to raise an army against Botaneiates. However, when the time came, Anna quickly and surreptitiously mobilized the remainder of the family and took refuge in the Hagia Sophia. From there she negotiated with the emperor for the safety of family members left in the capital, while protesting her sons' innocence of hostile actions. Under the falsehood of making a vesperal visit to worship at the church, she deliberately excluded the grandson of Botaneiates and his loyal tutor, met with Alexios and Isaac, and fled for the forum of Constantine. The tutor discovered they were missing and eventually found them on the palace grounds, but Anna was able to convince him that they would return to the palace shortly. Then to gain entrance to both the outer and inner sanctuary of the church, the women pretended to the gatekeepers that they were pilgrims from Cappadocia who had spent all their funds and wanted to worship before starting their return trip. However, before they were to gain entry into the sanctuary, Straboromanos and royal guards caught up with them to summon them back to the palace. Anna then protested that the family was in fear for their lives, her sons were loyal subjects (Alexios and Isaac were discovered absent without leave), and had learned of a plot by enemies of the Komnenoi to have them both blinded and had, therefore, fled the capital so they may continue to be of loyal service to the emperor. She refused to go with them and demanded that they allow her to pray to the Mother of God for protection. This request was granted and Anna then manifested her true theatrical and manipulative capabilities:

Nikephoros III Botaneiates was forced into a public vow that he would grant protection to the family. Straboromanos tried to give Anna his cross, but for her it was not large enough for all bystanders to witness the oath. She also demanded that the cross be personally sent by Botaneiates as a vow of his good faith. He obliged, sending a complete assurance for the family with his own cross. At the emperor's further insistence, and for their own protection, they took refuge at the convent of Petrion, where they were eventually joined by Maria of Bulgaria, mother of Irene Doukaina. Botaneiates allowed them to be treated as refugees rather than as guests. They were allowed to have family members bring in their own food and were on good terms with the guards from whom they learned the latest news. Anna was highly successful in three important aspects of the revolt: she bought time for her sons to steal imperial horses from the stables and escape the city; she distracted the emperor, giving her sons time to gather and arm their troops; and she gave a false sense of security to Botaneiates that there was no real treasonous plot against him. After bribing the Western troops guarding the city, Isaac and Alexios Komnenos entered the capital victoriously on 1 April 1081.

During this time, Alexios was rumored to be the lover of Empress Maria, the daughter of King Bagrat IV of Georgia, who had been successively married to Michael VII Doukas and his successor Nikephoros III Botaneiates, and who was renowned for her beauty. Alexios arranged for Maria to stay on the palace grounds, and it was thought that he was considering marrying her. However, his mother consolidated the Doukas family connection by arranging the Emperor's marriage to Irene Doukaina, granddaughter of the Caesar John Doukas, the uncle of Michael VII, who would not have supported Alexios otherwise. As a measure intended to keep the support of the Doukai, Alexios restored Constantine Doukas, the young son of Michael VII and Maria, as co-emperor and a little later betrothed him to his own first-born daughter Anna, who moved into the Mangana Palace with her fiancé and his mother.

This situation changed drastically, however, when Alexios' first son John II Komnenos was born in 1087: Anna's engagement to Constantine was dissolved, and she was moved to the main Palace to live with her mother and grandmother. Alexios became estranged from Maria, who was stripped of her imperial title and retired to a monastery, and Constantine Doukas was deprived of his status as co-emperor. Nevertheless, he remained on good terms with the imperial family and succumbed to his weak constitution soon afterwards.

Wars against the Normans, Pechenegs, and Tzachas

The thirty-seven year reign of Alexios was full of struggle. At the outset he faced the formidable attack of the Normans, led by Robert Guiscard and his son Bohemund, who took Dyrrhachium and Corfu and laid siege to Larissa in Thessaly (see Battle of Dyrrhachium). Alexios suffered several defeats before he was able to strike back with success. He enhanced his resistance by bribing the German king Henry IV with 360,000 gold pieces to attack the Normans in Italy, which forced the Normans to concentrate on their defenses at home in 1083–84. He also secured the alliance of Henry, Count of Monte Sant'Angelo, who controlled the Gargano Peninsula and dated his charters by Alexios' reign. Henry's allegiance would be the last example of Byzantine political control on peninsular Italy. The Norman danger subsided with the death of Guiscard in 1085, and the Byzantines recovered most of their losses.

Alexios next had to deal with disturbances in Thrace, where the heretical sects of the Bogomils and the Paulicians revolted and made common cause with the Pechenegs from beyond the Danube. Paulician soldiers in imperial service likewise deserted during Alexios' battles with the Normans. As soon as the Norman threat had passed, Alexios set out to punish the rebels and deserters, confiscating their lands. This led to a further revolt near Philippopolis, and the commander of the field army in the west, Gregory Pakourianos, was defeated and killed in the ensuing battle. In 1087 the Pechenegs raided into Thrace, and Alexios crossed into Moesia to retaliate but failed to take Dorostolon (Silistra). During his retreat, the emperor was surrounded and worn down by the Pechenegs, who forced him to sign a truce and to pay protection money. In 1090 the Pechenegs invaded Thrace again, while Tzachas, the brother-in-law of the Sultan of Rum, launched a fleet and attempted to arrange a joint siege of Constantinople with the Pechenegs. Alexios overcame this crisis by entering into an alliance with a horde of 40,000 Cumans, with whose help he crushed the Pechenegs at Levounion in Thrace on 29 April 1091.

This put an end to the Pecheneg threat, but in 1094 the Cumans began to raid the imperial territories in the Balkans. Led by a pretender claiming to be Constantine Diogenes, a long-dead son of the Emperor Romanos IV, the Cumans crossed the mountains and raided into eastern Thrace until their leader was eliminated at Adrianople. With the Balkans more or less pacified, Alexios could now turn his attention to Asia Minor, which had been almost completely overrun by the Seljuq Turks.

Byzantine–Seljuq Wars and the First Crusade

By the time Alexios ascended the throne, the Seljuqs had taken most of Asia Minor. Alexios was able to secure much of the coastal regions by sending peasant soldiers to raid the Seljuq camps, but these victories were unable to stop the Turks altogether. As early as 1090, Alexios had taken reconciliatory measures towards the Papacy, with the intention of seeking western support against the Seljuqs. In 1095 his ambassadors appeared before Pope Urban II at the Council of Piacenza. The help he sought from the West was simply some mercenary forces, not the immense hosts that arrived, to his consternation and embarrassment, after the pope preached the First Crusade at the Council of Clermont later that same year. This was the People's Crusade: a mob of mostly unarmed pilgrims led by the preacher Peter the Hermit. Not quite ready to supply this number of people as they traversed his territories, the emperor saw his Balkan possessions subjected to further pillage at the hands of his own allies. Eventually Alexios dealt with the People's Crusade by hustling them on to Asia Minor. There, they were massacred by the Turks of Kilij Arslan I at the Battle of Civetot in October 1096.

The "Prince's Crusade", the second and much more formidable host of crusaders, gradually made its way to Constantinople, led in sections by Godfrey of Bouillon, Bohemond of Taranto, Raymond IV of Toulouse, and other important members of the western nobility. Alexios used the opportunity to meet the crusader leaders separately as they arrived, extracting from them oaths of homage and the promise to turn over conquered lands to the Byzantine Empire. Transferring each contingent into Asia, Alexios promised to supply them with provisions in return for their oaths of homage. The crusade was a notable success for Byzantium, as Alexios recovered a number of important cities and islands. The siege of Nicaea by the crusaders forced the city to surrender to the emperor in 1097, and the subsequent crusader victory at Dorylaion allowed the Byzantine forces to recover much of western Asia Minor. John Doukas re-established Byzantine rule in Chios, Rhodes, Smyrna, Ephesus, Sardis, and Philadelphia in 1097–1099. This success is ascribed by Alexios' daughter Anna to his policy and diplomacy, but by the Latin historians of the crusade to his treachery and deception. In 1099, a Byzantine fleet of ten ships was sent to assist the crusaders in capturing Laodicea and other coastal towns as far as Tripoli. The crusaders believed their oaths were made invalid when the Byzantine contingent under Tatikios failed to help them during the siege of Antioch; Bohemund, who had set himself up as Prince of Antioch, briefly went to war with Alexios in the Balkans, but he was blockaded by the Byzantine forces and agreed to become a vassal of Alexios by the Treaty of Deabolis in 1108.

Around this time, in 1106, the twentieth year of his reign, Hesychius of Miletus records that the sky suddenly darkened and a "violent southern wind" blew the great statue of Constantine at the Strategion from its column, killing a number of men and women nearby.

In 1116, though already terminally ill, Alexios conducted a series of defensive operations in Bithynia and Mysia to defend his Anatolian territories against the inroads of Malik Shah, the Seljuq Sultan of Iconium. In 1117 he moved onto the offensive and pushed his army deep into the Turkish-dominated Anatolian Plateau, where he defeated the Seljuq sultan at the Battle of Philomelion.

Personal life

During the last twenty years of his life Alexios lost much of his popularity. The years were marked by persecution of the followers of the Paulician and Bogomil heresies—one of his last acts was to publicly burn at the stake Basil, a Bogomil leader, with whom he had engaged in a theological dispute. In spite of the success of the First Crusade, Alexios also had to repel numerous attempts on his territory by the Seljuqs in 1110–1117.

Alexios was for many years under the strong influence of an eminence grise, his mother Anna Dalassene, a wise and immensely able politician whom, in a uniquely irregular fashion, he had crowned as Augusta instead of the rightful claimant to the title, his wife Irene Doukaina. Alexios was never happier than when taking part in military exercises and he assumed personal command of his troops whenever possible. As such, Dalassene was the effective administrator of the Empire during Alexios' long absences in military campaigns: she was constantly at odds with her daughter-in-law and had assumed total responsibility for the upbringing and education of her granddaughter Anna Komnene.

Succession
Alexios' last years were also troubled by anxieties over the succession. Although he had crowned his son John II Komnenos co-emperor at the age of five in 1092, his wife Irene Doukaina wished to alter the succession in favor of their daughter Anna and Anna's husband, Nikephoros Bryennios the Younger. Bryennios had been made kaisar (Caesar) and received the newly created title of panhypersebastos ("honoured above all"), and remained loyal to both Alexios and John.

Pretenders and rebels
Apart from all of his external enemies, a host of rebels also sought to overthrow Alexios from the imperial throne, thereby posing another major threat to his reign.  Due to the troubled times the empire was enduring, he had by far the greatest number of rebellions against him of all the Byzantine emperors.  These included:

Pre First Crusade
 Raictor, a Byzantine monk who claimed to be the emperor Michael VII. He presented himself to Robert Guiscard who used him as a pretext to launch his invasion of the Byzantine Empire.
 A conspiracy in 1084 involving several senators and officers of the army. This was uncovered before too many followers were enlisted. In order to conceal the importance of the conspiracy, Alexios merely banished the wealthiest plotters and confiscated their estates.
 Tzachas, a Seljuq Turkic emir who assumed the title of emperor in 1092.
 Constantine Humbertopoulos, who had assisted Alexios in gaining the throne in 1081 conspired against him in 1091 with an Armenian called Ariebes.
 John Komnenos, Alexios' nephew, governor of Dyrrachium, accused of a conspiracy by Theophylact of Bulgaria.
 Theodore Gabras, the quasi-independent governor of Trebizond and his son Gregory.
 Michael Taronites, the brother-in-law of Alexios.
 Nikephoros Diogenes, the son of emperor Romanos IV.
 Pseudo-Leo Diogenes , an impostor who assumed the identity of another of Romanos' sons, Leo Diogenes.
 Karykes, the leader of a revolt in Crete.
 Rhapsomates, who tried to create an independent kingdom in Cyprus.

Post First Crusade
 Salomon, a senator of great wealth who in 1106 engaged in a plot with four brothers of the Anemas family.
 Gregory Taronites, another governor of Trebizond.
 The illegitimate descendant of a Bulgarian prince named Aron formed a plot in 1107 to murder Alexios as he was encamped near Thessalonica. The presence of the empress Irene and her attendants, however, made the execution of the plot difficult. In an attempt to have her return to Constantinople, the conspirators produced pamphlets that mocked and slandered the empress, and left them in her tent. A search for the author of the publications uncovered the whole plot, yet Aron was only banished due to his connection to the royal line of Bulgaria, whose blood also flowed in the veins of the empress Irene.

Reform of the monetary system

Under Alexios the debased solidus (tetarteron and histamenon) was discontinued and a gold coinage of higher fineness (generally .900–.950) was established in 1092, commonly called the hyperpyron at 4.45 grs. The hyperpyron was slightly smaller than the solidus.

It was introduced along with the electrum aspron trachy worth a third of a hyperpyron and about 25% gold and 75% silver, the billon aspron trachy or stamenon, valued at 48 to the hyperpyron and with 7% silver wash and the copper tetarteron and noummion worth 18 and 36 to the billon aspron trachy.

Alexios' reform of the Byzantine monetary system was an important basis for the financial recovery and therefore supported the so-called Komnenian restoration, as the new coinage restored financial confidence.

Legacy

Alexios I had overcome a dangerous crisis and stabilized the Byzantine Empire, inaugurating a century of imperial prosperity and success.  He had also profoundly altered the nature of the Byzantine government.  By seeking close alliances with powerful noble families, Alexios put an end to the tradition of imperial exclusivity and co-opted most of the nobility into his extended family and, through it, his government. Those who did not become part of this extended family were deprived of power and prestige.  This measure, which was intended to diminish opposition, was paralleled by the introduction of new courtly dignities, like that of panhypersebastos given to Nikephoros Bryennios, or that of sebastokrator given to the emperor's brother Isaac Komnenos.  Although this policy met with initial success, it gradually undermined the relative effectiveness of imperial bureaucracy by placing family connections over merit. Alexios' policy of integration of the nobility bore the fruit of continuity: every Byzantine emperor who reigned after Alexios I Komnenos was related to him by either descent or marriage.

Family 

By his marriage with Irene Doukaina, Alexios I had the following children:
 Anna Komnene (1 December 1083 – 1148/55), in her infancy she was betrothed to Constantine Doukas, and with him treated as co-ruler by her father until after the birth of John II. In 1097 she married Nikephoros Bryennios the Younger, later raised to Caesar. Highly ambitious, after Alexios' death she tried unsuccessfully to usurp the throne. She then withdrew to a monastery, where she wrote her history of Alexios' reign. The couple had several children, but only four survived her.
 Maria Komnene (19 September 1085 – after 1136), initially betrothed to Gregory Gabras, but married to Nikephoros Katakalon. The couple had several children, but only two sons are known by name.
 John II Komnenos (13 September 1087 – 8 April 1143), who succeeded as emperor.
 Andronikos Komnenos (18 September 1091 – 1130/31), was named sebastokrator and participated in several campaigns until his death from disease. He married Irene, likely a Russian princess, and had at least two sons.
 Isaac Komnenos (16 January 1093 – after 1152), sebastokrator.
 Eudokia Komnene (14 January 1094 – c. 1129), who married the son of Constantine Iasites.
 Theodora Komnene (15 January 1096) who married (1) Constantine Kourtikes and (2) Constantine Angelos. By him she was the grandmother of Emperors Isaac II Angelos and Alexios III Angelos, as well as the progenitor of the ruling dynasty of the Despotate of Epirus. Through Isaac II's daughter Irene Angelina's children by Philip of Swabia, she is an ancestor of many European royal families, including all European monarchs currently reigning.
 Manuel Komnenos, born February 1097 and known only from a manuscript now in Moscow, died probably soon after his birth
 Zoe Komnene, born March 1098 and known only from a manuscript now in Moscow, died probably soon after her birth

Later Russian sources also claim the existence of another daughter, Barbara, who supposedly married Grand Prince of Kiev Sviatopolk II Iziaslavich, but her existence is considered as a later invention by modern historians.

See also

Byzantine army (Komnenian era)
List of Byzantine emperors

Notes

Sources

Primary sources

Secondary sources

Further reading

External links

Alexius coinage

 

1050s births
1118 deaths
Year of birth uncertain

11th-century Byzantine emperors
1080s in the Byzantine Empire
1090s in the Byzantine Empire
1100s in the Byzantine Empire
1110s in the Byzantine Empire
12th-century Byzantine emperors
Byzantine people of the Byzantine–Norman wars
Byzantine people of the Byzantine–Seljuk wars
Byzantine people of the Crusades
Christian anti-Gnosticism
Domestics of the Schools
Eastern Orthodox monarchs
Nobilissimi
Panhypersebastoi
People associated with Xenophontos Monastery